Śródmieście is one of four districts of the city of Szczecin, Poland, situated in central part of the city. In 2022, it had the population of 104 294 people, and an area of 45.9 km² (17.7 square miles).

History 
The city had been originally divided into four districts in 1955. Said subdivisions were: Dąbie, Nad Odrą, Pogodno, and Śródmieście. The district of Śródmieście was located in the south-central portion of the city, roughly corresponding with its location to the modern district of Śródmieście, though with different boundaries. The four districts were abolished in 1976. The city was again divided into four districts in 1990, with one of the established subdivisions being Śródmieście.

Subdivisions
Śródmieście is divided into 10 municipal neighbourhoods.

Notes

References

Neighbourhoods of Szczecin
1990 establishments in Poland
States and territories established in 1990